The JTNews (formerly The Jewish Transcript) was a Jewish-American newspaper that served the U.S. state of Washington. The biweekly paper, published in Seattle, was owned by the Jewish Federation of Greater Seattle and had a readership of 16,000. Founded by Herman Horowitz, it was first published on March 6, 1924, as the Jewish Transcript of the Pacific Northwest. The paper ceased publication in February 2015. It was replaced by Jewish in Seattle, which first published in August 2015.

References

Biweekly newspapers published in the United States
Jewish newspapers published in the United States
Jews and Judaism in Washington (state)
Newspapers published in Seattle
Newspapers established in 1924
Publications disestablished in 2016
Defunct newspapers published in Washington (state)
1924 establishments in Washington (state)
2016 disestablishments in Washington (state)